Xingguo County is a county in south central Jiangxi province, People's Republic of China. Its population was 719,830 at the 2010 census.

History
In 236 during the Three Kingdoms period Pingyang County was set up in the current area of Xingguo County. In 982 during the Northern Song period the county of Xingguo was set up, named after the Taipingxingguo era (AD 976 – 984) of the emperor of that time.

Xingguo was one of the counties controlled by the Chinese Communist Party in the Jiangxi–Fujian Soviet, a constituent entity of the Chinese Soviet Republic from 1931. The county was then captured by the Kuomintang forces in 1934 as part of the fifth encirclement campaigns.

Administration
As of end of 2019, Xingguo has jurisdiction over 8 towns, 17 townships and 1 economic development zone. The seat of the county locates at the Lianjiang Town.

8 towns

17 townships

Geography

Location
Xingguo County locates in the central south of Jiangxi Province, and in the north of Ganzhou prefectural level city. The distance to the center of Ganzhou is about 82 kilometers, and the distance to the provincial capital Nanchang is about 346 kilometers.

Topography
The length from east to west is 84 kilometers and the width from north to south is 71.5 kilometers. Xingguo is mostly covered by hills and mountains: mountains over 1000 meters on the east, north and west edges, while hilly areas in the center and south parts, with a small basin around the county seat Lianjiang Town. The highest point is the Mount Dawushan at Fengbian Township in the north with elevation of 1204 meters, while the lowest point locates at Mubu Village, Longkou Township in the south with elevation of 127.9 meters.

Rivers
The rivers in Xingguo are mostly tributaries to Gong River, which forms Gan River together with Zhang River near the city center of Ganzhou.

There are several reservoirs in Xingguo, the largest one being Changgang Reservoir at Changgang Township.

Climate
Xingguo has a humid subtropical climate. The annual average temperature is 19.0 °C, and the average annual precipitation is 1545 mm.

Demographics
According to the official website, the population in 2015 was about 820,000. Xingguo is Hakka area, the ancestors of the population mostly came from Henan, Gansu and other provinces such as Shaanxi, Hebei, Shanxi and Shandong.

There are a small number of She people living in Xingguo. According to the records, there were 810 households and 4419 She people in 1986. Four villages in Xingguo are designated to She people.

Places of interests

The Revolutionary Sites of Xingguo is on the list of Major Historical and Cultural Sites Protected at the National Level. It includes 5 different sites where Mao Zedong, Communist Party, and Red Army had had activities during 1929 - 1933. As a result of these activities, there has been 54 persons from Xingguo appointed as major generals, lieutenant generals, or colonel generals in the army  (later additional 2 persons were appointed). So Xingguo is nicknamed as the County of Generals.

In addition, there are 19 historical and cultural sites protected at the provincial level, 9 sites at the prefectural city level, and 25 sites at the county level.

 Lianjiang Academy: Built in 1738 as an academy of classical learning. Mao Zedong held the training class for cadre on land reforms here in 1929. Later it functioned as the seat of the Soviet government of Xingguo County from 1930 to 1934. Protected at the national level as a part of the Revolutionary Sites of Xingguo.
 Zhuhua Pagoda: Initially built during the Tang dynasty, later rebuilt in 1550 during the Ming dynasty. The central pillar is in square shape, which is quite uncommon among pagodas. Protected at the provincial level.
 Inscription "Yongzhen Jiangnan" ("Eternally safeguarding the south of Yangtze") by Wen Tianxiang: It locates in a temple at the top of Mount Dawushan. Protected at the provincial level.
 Bingxin Cave: Scenery with Danxia landform.
 Taipingyan Cave: A cave in Karst landscape area in Meijiao Town.

Transportation

Highways and roads
 Expressways of China: G72 Quanzhou–Nanning Expressway, Xingguo–Ganxian Expressway
 China National Highways: G238, G319, G356
 Provincial roads: S227, S229

Railway
There are two railway stations in the county. High-speed services call at Xingguo West railway station and all other services call at Xingguo railway station.

Air
Both airports are within 100 kilometers distance.
 Ganzhou Huangjin Airport
 Jinggangshan Airport

Culture

Hakka culture
Xingguo is a settlement for Hakka people, so it has the characteristics of Hakka culture, including the Hakka Chinese language.

Folk song
In Xingguo there is a unique folk song genre called Xingguo Shan'ge (mountain song).

Feng shui
Xingguo is also one of the founding places of feng shui philosophy. Sanliao Village in Meijiao Town is known as the First Village of Feng Shui Culture.

Notable people
 Colonel generals: Chen Qihan, Xiao Hua
 Lieutenant general: Qiu Huizuo
 Politicians: Guo Shengkun, Wang Taihua, Yang Shangkui, Zeng Qinghong

Cuisine and specialities
 Xingguo red carp
 Steamed and dried sweet potato
 Xingguo fish noodle: made from fish meat and sweet potato powder.
 Fen long chuang: fish or meat covered by sweet potato powder, together with spicy taro or sweet potato slices and rice noodles, steamed in a big bamboo case. Together with 4 small dishes, Mao Zedong named it as Si xing wang yue (fours stars gazing at the moon).

References

External links

Official website of Xingguo County government

 
Ganzhou
County-level divisions of Jiangxi